Boahen is a surname. Notable people with the surname include:

Albert Adu Boahen (1932–2006), Ghanaian academic, historian and politician 
Joseph Boahen Aidoo (or Jospeh Aidoo), Ghanaian politician
Kwabena Boahen (born 1964), American academic